David Berg or Dave Berg may refer to:

Dave Berg (infielder) (born 1970), retired Major League Baseball infielder
Dave Berg (cartoonist) (1920–2002), American cartoonist
Dave Berg (songwriter), American country music songwriter
David Berg (1919–1994), founder of the Children of God (now Family International) cult
David Berg (pitcher) (born 1993), retired baseball pitcher
Dave Berg (producer), American producer of The Tonight Show with Jay Leno